Victor Doyle may refer to:

Victor Doyle, fictional character in Revolution (TV series)
Victor Doyle, fictional character in The Smurfs 2